{{DISPLAYTITLE:C18H29NO4}}
The molecular formula C18H29NO4 (molar mass: 323.43 g/mol, exact mass: 323.2097 u) may refer to:

 Bufetolol
 Cicloprolol